Little Flower Secondary School is a boarding school in Rabiraj, Saptari District, Nepal. The school was founded in 1992 (2048 B.S.).

Education
The school offers classes from Junior level Nursery to Grade 10. The medium of education is English and Nepali.

See also
 List of educational institutions in Rajbiraj

Secondary schools in Nepal
Saptari District
Educational institutions established in 1992
1992 establishments in Nepal